Pert or PERT may refer to:

Ships
  - see List of United States Navy ships: P
 , a World War II corvette, originally HMS Nepeta
 Pert (sidewheeler), a 19th-century steamboat that operated in British Columbia, Canada

Statistics
 PERT distribution

People
 Pert (surname)
 Pert Kelton (1907–1968), American actress

PERT
 Program evaluation and review technique, or PERT Chart, a planning method
 Postsecondary Education Readiness Test, a placement test used by Florida high schools and colleges

Other uses
 Pert Plus, a brand of shampoo marketed in Australia and New Zealand as Pert
 , an expression to calculate the expected return from a continuously compounded investment given the principal, rate, and time

See also
 Peart, a surname